Slang Dictionary could refer to:
 Slang dictionary, a class of dictionaries of slang and informal language
 The Slang Dictionary by John Camden Hotten, first published in 1859